City on a Hill Press, originally launched in 1966 as The Fulcrum, is the weekly student newspaper of the University of California, Santa Cruz (UCSC). Designed as a magazine, the weekly tabloid-sized paper releases new issues every Thursday of the fall, winter and spring academic quarters, as well as a back-to-school issue entitled "Primer" at the end of the summer session, for a total of 30 issues per school year.

The paper reports not only on UCSC campus news, but also on news in the city of Santa Cruz.

Awards 
The paper was named the 1986 College Gold Crown Newspaper by the Columbia Scholastic Press Association, as well as Best All-Around Student Newspaper in 1983 from the Society of Professional Journalists. Editorials and illustrations have also received CSPA awards in the past two decades. Most recently in 2007, the paper received CSPA honors for cover design and page layout.

Gabby Areas (2013-2014 Managing Editor), Cory Fong (2013-2014 Co-Editor-in-Chief), Jayden Norris (2013-2014 Co-Editor-in-Chief) and Jon Vorpe (2013-2014 Managing Editor) won a Society of Professional Journalists’ Mark of Excellence Award as finalists for best all around non daily student newspaper.

Humjune Geo (fall 2013 Campus reporter), Elizabeth Harris (fall 2013 Campus reporter), Abbie Jennings (fall 2013 Campus reporter) and Lauren Romero (fall 2013 Campus editor) won a Society of Professional Journalists' Mark of Excellence Award for the November 2013 article “UC Workers Refuse to be Silenced” as finalists in breaking news reporting by a non daily student newspaper.

Alia Wilson (spring 2007 Health/Science editor) and Daniel Zarchy (2008-09 Co-Editor in Chief), won the Katharine M. MacDonald Award for excellence in student journalism by the California State University, Sacramento Center for California Studies and the Sacramento Press Club for their 2006 story about immigration legislation in California.

Sam Laird (fall 2006 City reporter, winter 2007 City editor) won The Chronicle of Higher Educations fifth annual David W. Miller Award for Student Journalists for writing and reporting that he did while at City on a Hill Press, as well as a Columbia Scholastic Press Association Certificate of Merit for News Feature Writing for his 2007 story "The Colorblind Society: Are We There Yet?"

Alumni 

Notable alumni include Pulitzer Prize–winning journalists Dana Priest and Martha Mendoza.

See also 
Fish Rap Live!

References

External links
Official website

University of California, Santa Cruz
Publications established in 1966
Student newspapers published in California